"Misunderstood" is the debut single by Australian hip-hop musician Youngn Lipz, released independently though Biordi Music on 19 October 2019. The single was certified platinum in Australia in 2021.

At the APRA Music Awards of 2021, the song won Most Performed Hip Hop / Rap Work.

Music video
The music video was directed by Aman Sharma and filmed in Cabramatta in Sydney's south west.

Charts

Certifications

References

2019 debut singles
2019 songs
Youngn Lipz songs
Songs written by Youngn Lipz
APRA Award winners